The 1903–04 season was the fifth season for FC Barcelona.

Events
September 17, 1903: Arthur Witty relieved Pau Haas of the presidency of the club.

Squad

Results 

 1. First game outside of Barcelona Catalonia.

External links

References

FC Barcelona seasons
Barcelona